Moran  Autonomous Council is an Autonomous administrative divisions of India in the Indian state of Assam, for development and protection of ethnic Moran people. It was formed in 2020.

About
The Moran people are indigenous people living primarily in the Tinsukia district of Assam. The Moran Autonomous Council Bill 2020 was tabled in Assam Legislative Assembly on 24 March 2020 and it was passed in September 2020 without any objection from the opposition parties.

Administration
The Moran Autonomous Council consists of 25 members. 22 of these members are elected directly and three members are nominated by the Governor.

In January 2021, the Assam State Government said it will constitute interim councils for Moran Autonomous Council as elections to the autonomous council can't be done before the 2021 Assam Legislative Assembly election.

See also
 Karbi Anglong Autonomous Council
 Rabha Hasong Autonomous Council
 Kamatapur Autonomous Council
 Bodo Kachari Welfare Autonomous Council

References

Autonomous district councils of India
Local government in Assam